Juan Buenaventura de Borja y Armendia (b. 1564*, Gandía, Valencia  d. 1628, Santafé de Bogotá) was a Spanish noble of the House of Borja who served in multiple positions of power throughout the New Kingdom of Granada. He is perhaps best known for serving as the President of the Real Audiencia de Santa Fe de Bogotá.

Biography
Juan Bueanaventura was the son of Fernando de Borja Aragón y Castro and his wife, Violante de Armendia. He was the grandson of the Duke of Gandia, Saint Francis Borgia, third general of the Society of Jesus.

Upon completing his bachelor's education in the arts at the University of Alcalá, he enrolled himself in the University of Salamanca, where he further pursued a degree in canon studies.

He was legitimized by King Philip III of Spain during the Courts of Valencia on 14 January 1604, with a pedigree towards the military branch of the kingdom.

He carried out various functions within the New Kingdom of Granada; amongst them was his most famous role as the President of the Real Audiencia de Santa Fe de Bogotá, a post to which he was named in 1605. He was elected the Audencia's seventh president at 41 years of age, on 2 October 1605. He would continue uninterrupted in this post until his death 22 years later.

During his mandate, he carried out various campaigns against the local indigenous people of his territory. The most intense campaign was the pacification of the Pijao people, or the Federación Pijao, between 1605 and 1615. He further installed the Sancta Tribunal de la Inquisición at Cartagena de Indias. He ordered the creation of a grammatical process defined for the Chibchan languages and extended the collection of the Alcabala to many cities where it was previously not enforced.

In 1605, he created the Tribunal de Cuentas de Santafé, and, in 1620, a royal decree ordered the establishment of a Mint for the New Kingdom of Granada.

He was conferred with the honor of being a Knight of the Order of Santiago by royal warrant at the city of Lerma on 22 May 1610.

Death and legacy
He died in Santafé de Bogotá in 1628 and was buried at the foot of the city's main cathedral. He was not immediately succeeded in his role as President of the Audencia. Instead, the oidor or hearer of Lesmes de Espinosa Saravia took control of governmental matters until a new president was finally appointed in 1630.

Ancestry

Marriage and Descendants

On 3 September 1597, he married Violante Miguel de Heredia y Forcadell. Violante was born in Ulldecoma, Tarragona, and was the daughter of Jaime Miguel de Heredia y de Beatriz Forcadell. Juan had eight children. Amongst them was Juan de Borja y Miguel, who at Riobamba started a family that would later become the prestigious Ecuadorian and Chilean Borja families.

See also
 Natagaima

References

 
 
 

1564 births
1628 deaths
Spanish untitled nobility
University of Salamanca alumni
Juan Buenaventura
Knights of Santiago